The Death of Vishnu (2001) is a novel by Indian-American writer Manil Suri. The book is about the spiritual journey of a dying man named Vishnu living on a landing of a Bombay apartment building, as well as the lives of the residents living in the building.

Awards and honors
2001 Booker Prize, longlist
2001 Kiriyama Prize, finalist (fiction)
2002 McKitterick Prize, winner
2002 PEN/Robert W. Bingham Prize, co-winner
2002 PEN/Faulkner Award, nominee
2002 ALA Notable Books for Adults
2002 Barnes & Noble, winner

2001 American novels
American philosophical novels
Novels set in Mumbai
W. W. Norton & Company books